Dan Mircea Geoană (born 14 July 1958) is a Romanian politician and former ambassador who served as president of the upper chamber of the Romanian Parliament, the Senate from 20 December 2008 until he was revoked on 23 November 2011. From 21 April 2005 until 21 February 2010, he was the head of the Social Democratic Party (PSD), Romania's largest political party to this day. Furthermore, he was the candidate of the party for the position of President of Romania in the 2009 presidential election which he narrowly lost to Traian Băsescu.

He was dismissed from PSD on 22 November 2011 but rejoined the party in late 2012. From 2015 to 2018, he was the founder and leader of the Romanian Social Party. Additionally, he was also the president of Aspen Institute Romania, which is an apolitical and non-profit organisation.

On 17 July 2019, he was appointed deputy secretary general of NATO, replacing Rose Gottemoeller.

History
From 28 December 2000 to 28 December 2004, Geoană was the Foreign Minister of Romania, as part of the PSD government of Adrian Năstase. After the Romanian legislative elections of 2004, he was replaced by Mihai Răzvan Ungureanu from the Justice and Truth Alliance (DA).

In 2001, Geoană was the chairman of the Organization for Security and Co-operation in Europe. In 2004, during the local elections in Romania, he ran for Mayor of Bucharest, but lost to incumbent mayor Traian Băsescu of the Democratic Party (PD) right in the first round.

A career diplomat, from 1996 to 2000 Geoană served as Romania's ambassador to the United States. At the time, he was the youngest ambassador in Romania's diplomatic corps.

Considered a young reformer, Geoană was elected president of the party on 25 April 2005 by delegates at a PSD Party Congress held in Bucharest. His victory represented a surprise defeat for the former president and founder of the PSD Ion Iliescu, who was expected to defeat Geoană easily. Geoană's win was attributed by the media to last minute backroom dealing by party leaders opposed to Iliescu as well as to public gaffes made by Iliescu at the Party Congress, including using the term comrades ("tovarăși") when referring to his fellow party colleagues.

At the PSD Congress on 10 December 2006, Geoană was re-elected as party President, with his platform, "Social Romania", defeating Sorin Oprescu's.

2009 Presidential Election 
On 3 December 2009, candidates in the second round, Băsescu and Geoană met in a televised debate that marked the final confrontation of the campaign. The event was held at the Palace of the Parliament. The debate started with a presentation of arguments that Băsescu and Geoană tried in turn to explain why Romanians should vote for them. The candidate of the PSD+PC Alliance said he came up with a project to develop the country and has demonstrated that he can unite the Romanians and keep "a constructive tone and a positive approach." He discussed the three pillars that he sustains: redefining the way that Romania is working, agriculture, and developing the working field. Geoană specified that his alliance with the liberals, initialed in Timișoara, is sincere and not based on political interests. He expressed hope that Băsescu will not use in the debate means and personal attacks, "like the way in which he designed the campaign, which was based on lies and personal attacks on the family."

In turn, Băsescu said that the presidency is a privilege and a "huge obligation" which marked him every day in the five-year term when he was president of Romania. His speech was focused on supporting the accelerated reform of the state in which the "voice of Romanians must be heard". The head of state proposed "a government of politicians for politicians". Băsescu spoke about the Social Democrats (PSD), whom he accused that they do not understand the country's priorities, and are instead interested in acquiring political privileges. The candidate supported by the Liberal Democrats (PDL) recalled the possibility of the return to power of former communist government officials and Iliescu should Geoană win the presidential election. Additionally, Băsescu promised that it would immediately pass Romanians outcome of the referendum of 22 November to reduce the number of MPs and creating a unicameral parliament, which he never did. The two candidates' approaches were often strewn during the three hours of debate with personal attacks and mutual accusations. The President stated that the support structure of Geoană's campaign was linked to television stations owned by Sorin Ovidiu Vântu and Dan Voiculescu, and supported by Dinu Patriciu's public interventions. The two presidential candidates swore with the hand on a Bible provided by Robert Turcescu, the moderator of the debate. While Geoană vowed he had not promised any benefits to Patriciu, Vântu, and Voiculescu, Băsescu vowed that he "never punched a child in the plexus or in the face".

An flashpoint of the 2009 presidential election was the revelation that Geoană, then President of the Senate and vice-president of the Supreme Council of National Defence, made a private visit to Moscow on April 27, 2009, where he met with Dimitry Medeved, then President of the Russian Federation. The visit was confirmed by Cristian Diaconescu, the Romanian Minister of Foreign Affairs at the time of the visit and by his campaign team although initially dening knowledge of such a meeting taking place. Geoană's opponents, including Traian Băsecu and Crin Antonescu, criticized Geoană for this visit and the manner in which it was organized. The visit became an important topic during the presidential election because it raised questions about Geoană's stance on Russia at that time. Concerns were also brought up about Geoană's possible ties to Boris Golovin, a Russian businessman and a former Soviet GRU/Spetnaz officer, the person who allegedly organized the visit. Golovin is a Russian businessman with interests in the Romanian energy sector who presents himself as a former Soviet GRU/Spetnaz officer.

Senate Presidency 
On 22 November 2011, after refusing to step down as the President of the Senate of Romania following the request of the PSD leadership, he was ousted as member of the party, losing the confidence of his colleagues in the Executive National Council of PSD where his dismissal was voted 50 to 5 while 3 abstained. In the following days he will have to step down as President of the Upper House of the Romanian Parliament as he no longer has the support of a party group in the Senate. The following day he was revoked by the senators in the plenary meeting with 112 votes for, 2 against and 5 abstentions. He remains an independent senator. He was readmitted into the party banks in Autumn 2012, after a reconciliation with the PSD leadership.

Personal life
He is married to Mihaela Geoană, Former President of the Romanian Red Cross from 2007 to 2015. They have two children together: a daughter, Maria and a son, Alexandru Ion.

Electoral history

Mayor of Bucharest

Presidential elections

References

External links
  Official website

|-

 

1958 births
Ambassadors of Romania to the United States
Bucharest Academy of Economic Studies alumni
Candidates for President of Romania
Eastern Orthodox Christians from Romania
École nationale d'administration alumni
Living people
Members of the Senate of Romania
Politicians from Bucharest
Presidents of the Senate of Romania
Presidents of the Social Democratic Party (Romania)
Romanian Ministers of Foreign Affairs
Members of the Romanian Orthodox Church
Social Democratic Party (Romania) politicians
Diplomats from Bucharest